John Foran (born 1955) is an American sociologist with research interests in global climate justice; radical social movements, revolutions, and radical social change; Third World cultural studies; and Latin American and Middle Eastern studies. He has a PhD from the University of California, Berkeley and is a professor of Sociology at the University of California, Santa Barbara.

Selected publications
 On the Edges of Development:  Cultural Interventions (coeditor, Routledge, 2009)
 Revolution in the Making of the Modern World:  Social Identities, Globalization, and Modernity (coeditor, Routledge, 2008)
 Taking Power:  On the Origins of Third World Revolutions (Cambridge University Press, 2005)
 Feminist Futures: Re-imagining Women, Culture and Development (coeditor, Zed Press, 2003);
 The Future of Revolutions: Re-thinking Radical Change in the Age of Globalization (ed., Zed Press, 2003);
 Theorizing Revolutions (ed., Routledge, 1997);
 Fragile Resistance: Social Transformation in Iran From 1500 to the Revolution (Westview Press, 1993).

External links
Homepage at UCSB (this includes a link to his website on the case method of teaching in global and international studies, as well as a free e-book version of Fragile Resistance)

American sociologists
Revolution theorists
Living people
1955 births